Manuel Alexandre Abarca OAXS MML (11 November 1917 – 12 October 2010) was a Spanish film and television actor.

Career
He was a popular supporting actor. He won an Honorary Goya Award in 2003 for his career achievements.

Filmography in cinema
1947
 Dos cuentos para dos
1952
Welcome Mr. Marshall!  (credited as  Manuel Alejandre) .... Secretario
1953
Nadie lo sabrá 
1954
Cómicos 
La venganza
Felices pascuas
Manicomio 
1955
Muerte de un ciclista  ....
El Mensaje ....
1956
Viaje de novios ....
Calle mayor ....
El Malvado Carabel .... Dr. Solás
Calabuch (credited as Manuel Alejandre) .... Vicente
Todos somos necesarios ....
La Vida es maravillosa ....
1957
El Andén ....
Los jueves, milagro .... Mauro
 The Tenant ....
El Fotogénico ....
1958
 Night and Dawn ....
I Zitelloni  ....
La vida por delante .... Manolo
La venganza ....
El Hombre del paraguas blanco ....
El Aprendiz de malo ....
1959
De espaldas a la puerta ....
Fulano y Mengano ....
Azafatas con permiso .... Agente C-38
Sonatas .... Teniente Andrade
Bombas para la paz (credited as  Manuel Alejandre) .... Novio citado a las 11
Y después del cuplé ....
El Secreto de papá ....
1960
La Paz empieza nunca ....
091 Policía al habla  ....
Amor bajo cero  ....
El traje de oro ....
Sólo para hombres  ....
Hay alguien detrás de la puerta ....
1961
Plácido .... Julián Alonso
Vamos a contar mentiras  ....
1962  
Les Quatre vérités  ....
Atraco a las tres .... Benítez
Accidente 703  ....
La Mano de un hombre muerto .... Theo
Vampiresas 1930 .... Director
1963
El Verdugo ....
El Juego de la verdad  ....
La Batalla del domingo ....
Chantaje a un torero ....
La becerrada ....
1964
La Boda ....
La Muerte silba un blues .... Julius Smith
Crucero de verano .... Gutiérrez
Los Palomos, Los .... Eugenio Martínez
El Señor de La Salle .... Abate Bricot
El Salario del crimen ....
1965
Il Segreto del vestito rosso   ....
Historias de la televisión .... Técnico de TV (1)
La Primera aventura .... Remigio
1966
Fray Torero ....
Mayores con reparos ....
Las viudas   .... (episode. ’’Aniversario, El’’)
Operación Plus Ultra ....
Hoy como ayer .... Hipólito (farmacéutico moderno)
Un Beso en el puerto ....
La Barrera ....
Monnaie de singe  
1967
 Love in Flight  ....
La Mujer de otro ....
El hombre que mató a Billy el Niño ....
La Playa de las seducciones ....
1968
Relaciones casi públicas ....
Verde doncella ....
1969
Estudio amueblado 2.P. .... Rovira, el jefe de personal
Cuatro noches de boda ....
Amor a todo gas ....
Un Adulterio decente ....
1970
 Pierna creciente, falda menguante ....
 La Collera del vento  .... Agustín
 Don Erre que erre ....
 Enseñar a un sinvergüenza .... Padre de Rosana
 ¡Se armó el belén! ....
 ¡Vivan los novios! ....
1971
 Blanca por fuera y Rosa por dentro .... Sr. Perales, el profesor
1972
 El Vikingo ....
 Ligue Story (credited as Manolo Alexandre) .... Jerónimo
 Alta tensión ....
 La Cera virgen ....
 ¡Qué noche de bodas, chicas! ....
1973
 Corazón solitario ....
 Don Quijote cabalga de nuevo .... Mozo del juicio ante Sancho Panza.
 Las Tres perfectas casadas ....
 Señora doctor .... Dentista
1974
 Doctor, me gustan las mujeres, ¿es grave? ....
 Los Nuevos españoles ....
 Tocata y fuga de Lolita  ....
Jose Luis
 Jenaro el de los 14 ....
 Una chica y un señor ....
1975
 El asesino no está solo .... Detective 1
 Duerme, duerme, mi amor ....
1976
 Fulanita y sus menganos ....
 El Señor está servido ....
 Ambitious  ....
1977
 Chely ....
 La Violación ....
 Hasta que el matrimonio nos separe ....
 El Puente .... Rafael
 Vota a Gundisalvo ....
1978
 Los días del pasado ....
1979
 La Insólita y gloriosa hazaña del cipote de Archidona .... Vicente
 La Boda del señor cura, .... Alcalde de Reajo del Pino
1980
Black Jack ....
La Guerra de los niños .... Don Matías 'Don Mati'
Cariñosamente infiel ....
Tú estás loco Briones .... El Fugas
La Mano negra ....
1981
Gay Club ....
Préstame tu mujer ....
La segunda guerra de los niños .... Don Matías
Un pasota con corbata ....
1982
Las Locuras de Parchís (Las) .... Don Matías
El Cabezota ....
Caray con el divorcio ....
Adolescencia ....
1983
Parchís entra en acción  .... Don Matías
1984
El Caso Almería ....
1985
Extramuros  .... Capellán
1986
Las Tribulaciones de un Buda Bizco ....
El año de las luces .... Emilio
1987
¡Biba la banda! ....
El Bosque animado .... Roque Freire
1988
Sinatra .... Manolo
1989
Mar y el tiempo, El ....
Loco veneno ....
Amanece, que no es poco .... Paquito, su padre
1990
Pareja enloquecida busca madre de alquiler
1991
Fuera de juego
El Amor sí tiene cura ....
La Fuente de la edad .... Olegario, El Lentes
El Beso del sueño  ....  El Padre
1992
La Marrana  ....  Fray Jerónimo
Una Mujer bajo la lluvia  .... Don Emilio
1993
Madregilda  ....  Four Eyes
Tocando fondo  .... Marcelino
La Sombra del delator  ....
Todos a la cárcel  .... Modesto
1994
 n/d
1995
Así en el Cielo como en la Tierra  .... San José
1996
El Ángel de la guarda   .... Gen. Bazán
Pesadilla para un rico   .... Raúl
Los Porretas   ) .... José Pernales
Adiós, tiburón    .... Emiliano
1997
Siempre hay un camino a la derecha  .... Candelario
Nadie como tú  .... Sr. Vidal
La Duquesa roja  .... Cosme
1998
La Vuelta de El Coyote .... Julián
1999
París-Tombuctú .... Sento
Pídele cuentas al rey .... Pepón
2000
Terca vida .... Andrés
Maestros ....
2001
Lázaro de Tormes .... Escribano
Clara y Elena   .... Doctor
2002
El Caballero Don Quijote  .... Montesinos
2003
Atraco a las 3... y media  .... Don Felipe
Dos tipos duros .... Don Rodrigo
2004
Incautos  .... Manco
Franky Banderas .... Don Alejandro
2005Elsa y Fred .... Fred
2006Cabeza de perro .... Angelito¿Y tú quién eres?''  .... Ricardo

Honours 
 Gold Medal of Merit in Labour (Kingdom of Spain, 19 January 2004).
 Knight Grand Cross of the Civil Order of Alfonso X, the Wise (Kingdom of Spain, 20 June 2008).

See also
 Café Gijón (Madrid)

References

External links
 

1917 births
2010 deaths
Spanish male film actors
Spanish male television actors
Deaths from cancer in Spain
Honorary Goya Award winners
Male actors from Madrid